Duhat, Philippines,  may refer to various barangays in the Philippines:
Duhat, an urban barangay in Cavinti, Laguna Province
Duhat, a barangay in Padre Burgos, Quezon, Quezon province
Duhat, a barangay in Plaridel, Quezon, Quezon province
Duhat, a barangay in Santa Cruz, Laguna, Laguna Province
Duhat, a barangay in Bocaue, Bulacan Province